Saint-Michel-de-Chaillol (Occitan: Sant Michèu de Chalhòl), commonly known as Chaillol, is a commune in the French department of Hautes-Alpes, region of Provence-Alpes-Côte d'Azur, southeastern France.

Population

See also
Communes of the Hautes-Alpes department

References

Communes of Hautes-Alpes